Revolutions per Monkee is a television special, starring the Monkees, which aired on NBC on April 14, 1969. The musical guests on the show included Jerry Lee Lewis, Fats Domino, Little Richard, the Clara Ward Singers, the Buddy Miles Express, Paul Arnold and the Moon Express, and We Three in musical performances. It was produced by Jack Good (creator of the television series Shindig!).

Although they were billed as musical guests, Julie Driscoll and Brian Auger (alongside their then-backing band The Trinity) found themselves playing a prominent role; in fact, it can be argued that the special focused more on the guest stars (specifically, Auger and Driscoll) than the Monkees themselves. This special is notable as the Monkees' final performance as a quartet until 1986, as Peter Tork left the group at the end of the special's production.

The title is a play on " revolutions per minute".

Overview
The story follows Brian Auger and his assistant (Driscoll) as they take The Monkees through various stages of evolution until they are ready to brainwash the world via commercial exploitation. Trapped in giant test tubes, the four are stripped of all personal identity and names: Micky Dolenz becomes Monkee #1, Peter Tork becomes Monkee #2, Michael Nesmith Monkee #3, and Davy Jones Monkee #4.

Auger and Driscoll observe each Monkees' minds as the four attempt to regain their stripped personal identities through their fantasies. Mickey performs an R&B up-tempo duet remake of "I'm a Believer" with Driscoll; Peter reclines on a giant cushion in Eastern Garb and, to the lilting backing of sitar and tabla, performs "I Prithee (Do Not Ask for Love)," a gentle number concerning spiritual values. Mike, in an inventive blue-screen number, sings a country tune with himself ("Naked Persimmon"), and a toy-sized Davy sings and dances to the tune of "Goldilocks Sometime." Auger finds their fantasies 'interesting', and proceeds with the brainwash.

Now under Auger's control, the Monkees perform like stiff-legged wind-up robots ("Wind-up Man"). Auger, displeased with their wooden performance, introduces a four-part piano harmony in a unique piano-stacked set up with Auger and his electric keyboard on top, then descending to Jerry Lee Lewis, Little Richard and, finally, Fats Domino on the bottom. Charles Darwin appears and, disapproving of Auger's methods, introduces him and the Monkees to evolution, in the form of a psychedelic dance performance ("Only the Fittest Shall Survive"). Darwin turns the Monkees back into apes ("I Go Ape") and allows Auger, Driscoll and the Trinity to work from there. ("Come On Up").

With the process complete, Auger introduces the Monkees to a gig at the Paramount Theater on December 7, 1956 and describes them as "idolized, plasticized, psychoanalyzed, and sterilized". The four, dressed in outlandish 1950s vocal group gear, then immediately launch into a classic '50s rock medley: "At the Hop", "Shake a Tail Feather", "Little Darlin'", "Peppermint Twist", backed up by Jerry Lee Lewis, Little Richard, Fats Domino, We Three and the Clara Ward Singers. The guest performers contributed their own songs to the medley, with the Ward Singers performing "Dem Bones" as the segment's finale. Peter Tork's girlfriend Reine Stewart stood in as drummer for Fats Domino when his regular drummer could not attend.

Auger and Driscoll break character and announce that they've had enough of the show's brainwashing plot, stating they would rather have "complete and total freedom" (which Driscoll describes as "utter bloody shambles"), thus introducing the final act.

In a warehouse full of instruments and props, Davy stands atop a high staircase performing Bill Dorsey's "String for My Kite". Peter enters the scene next and performs, on a Hohner Clavinet, Solfeggietto by C.P.E. Bach. Finally, Mike and Micky arrive and perform "Listen to the Band", with Nesmith playing Gibson Les Paul Custom "Black Beauty", Tork on keyboards, Dolenz on drums and Jones on tambourine (in what turned out to be their final appearance as a quartet until 1986, as well as their final network television appearance as a quartet until 1996). As the song progresses, they are joined by Auger, Driscoll, Buddy Miles and an assortment of partygoers and musicians, until the music turns into a climactic frantic cacophony. The camera it zooms out to a book with "Chaos Is Come Again" on the next page. The book closes with "The Beginning of the End" on the front cover.

The closing credits feature a reversed scene from the Moon Express' dance sequence, with Tork singing "California, Here I Come" over the credits as California is nuked, killing off the fictional Monkees.

Production and broadcast issues

The general opinion of the viewers and participants of  Revolutions per Monkee is that the special was chaotic, both on-screen and off-screen. The Monkees went into rehearsals for the program one day after their return from their Australasian tour in October 1968.  Production on the program began in November 1968, after completing a press tour promoting their film, Head. Music sessions with Bones Howe and Michael Nesmith producing commenced in mid-November, with the final taping of the special occurring at the end of the month. Before production started, a strike at NBC almost meant that the special could not be taped; however, stage space was found at MGM Studios in Culver City, and the sets were transported there.  Because it was a last-minute change of location, the special was directed from outdoor broadcast trucks parked outside the soundstages.

The Monkees were reportedly angry with producer Jack Good and director Art Fisher's script for  Revolutions per Monkee, calling it "too sloppy, too fairy-tale like," while Davy Jones felt that, for a TV special starring the Monkees, it emphasized rather largely the guest cast over the group itself. Michael Nesmith, in liner notes for The Monkees Anthology CD compilation, called  "the TV version of Head".

While Peter Tork was, at one point, the only Monkee working on Head, ironically it was Tork who bought out his Monkees contract at the end of production of  Revolutions per Monkee (on December 20, 1968), reportedly suffering from exhaustion. Tork's departure reduced The Monkees to a trio, and the group was not seen on network TV as a foursome again until 1997. After production wrapped, Tork was given a gold watch as a going-away present, with the inscription "To Peter, from the guys down at work."

Negotiations were originally made in early 1968 for The Monkees to star in three NBC-TV specials to air in 1969;  Revolutions per Monkee was the first. Unhappy with the final edit, NBC decided to air it on the West Coast opposite The 41st Academy Awards on ABC. Further damage was done to the telecast by an engineer who accidentally presented  Revolutions per Monkee out of sequence. These incidents prompted NBC to cancel plans to produce the remaining Monkees specials. Because of the technology of the time, the Hawaiian broadcast of the special on then-affiliate KHON-TV was delayed for two weeks. At the time, television stations in Hawaii received network programming via film and videotape, as there were no telephone connections capable of television broadcasting, and satellite broadcasting was still in its infancy; it was finally shown there on April 28. Its telecast in Great Britain occurred on Saturday, May 24 on BBC2. It premiered in Australia on ATN7 Sunday, November 16.

Musical numbers
Micky Dolenz and Julie Driscoll: "I'm a Believer (Blues)"
Peter Tork: "I Prithee (Do Not Ask for Love)"
Michael Nesmith: "Naked Persimmon"
Davy Jones: "Goldilocks Sometime"
The Monkees: "Wind Up Man"; "Darwin"
Paul Arnold and The Moon Express: "Only the Fittest Shall Survive"
The Monkees: "I Go Ape"
Julie Driscoll, Brian Auger and The Trinity: "Come on Up"
Medley:
The Monkees: "At the Hop"
Fats Domino: "I'm Ready"
Jerry Lee Lewis: "Whole Lotta Shakin' Goin' On"
Little Richard: "Tutti Frutti"
We Three and The Monkees: "Shake a Tail Feather"
Fats Domino: "Blue Monday"
The Monkees: "Little Darlin'"
Little Richard: "Long Tall Sally"
Jerry Lee Lewis: "Down the Line"
The Clara Ward Singers: "Dem Bones"
Davy Jones: "String for My Kite"
Peter Tork: "Solfeggietto" by C.P.E. Bach
The Monkees and Entire Cast: "Listen to the Band"
Peter Tork: "California, Here I Come" (end titles)

DVD release
In the 1990s,  Revolutions per Monkee was released commercially by Rhino Home Video (parent company Rhino Entertainment owns the rights to The Monkees) in two different versions. The version of  Revolutions per Monkee released individually in January 1997 (R3 2284) has been on file for years at The Museum of Television & Radio (now known as the Paley Center for Media) in New York City, with good sound quality, a fuzzy picture and the segments in original broadcast order.

The DVD version features two commentary tracks; one by Brian Auger and the other by Micky Dolenz, who has mixed feelings about the program.

The special was remastered for the Monkees' 50th Anniversary Blu-Ray box set, but due to licensing restrictions, "Whole Lotta Shakin' Goin' On" was edited out from the medley.

Soundtrack
No official soundtrack has been released; nor was such a soundtrack planned, because of the technology of the time, wherein singers sang live vocals over prerecorded tracks.  It has also been said that many of the songs were left at MGM when production finished.  Some songs, however, have been officially released as bonus tracks on recent deluxe editions of Head and Instant Replay. The versions of songs with vocals have been lifted directly from the television audio.

A number of low-quality demo recordings are known to exist, including versions of "A String for My Kite" and "Wind Up Man" and unused songs "Buttoning the Buttons", "I Am a Fish", "Lucky You" and "The Bus & The Crocodile" - all performed by the same musician, probably the show's main songwriter Bill Dorsey. "I Am a Fish" was recorded by Tiny Tim under the title "The Other Side" in 1968. The tracks "I Ain't No Miracle Worker" and "I Wish That I Were Dead" (a.k.a. "But Now I Find") were officially-released singles by The Brogues, but have been erroneously listed as demo recordings for  Revolutions per Monkee, as has "My Community", written by Roger Atkins and Carl D'Errico, which was recorded by Tiny Tim under the title "Community" in 1968.  A vinyl bootleg, possibly recorded by placing a microphone in front of a television speaker while the program played, was produced by Zilch Records.

References
 

The Monkees
1960s American television specials
Music television specials
Musical television specials
1969 television specials
1969 in American television